Biswanath Assembly constituency is one of the 126 assembly constituencies of Assam Legislative Assembly. Biswanath forms part of the Tezpur Lok Sabha constituency.

Town Details

Following are details on Biswanath Assembly constituency-

Country: India.
 State: Assam.
 District: Biswanath district .
 Lok Sabha Constituency:  Tezpur Lok Sabha/Parliamentary constituency.
 Assembly Categorisation: Rural
 Literacy Level:  80%.
 Eligible Electors as per 2021 General Elections: 1,65,743 Eligible Electors. Male Electors:83,243 . Female Electors: 82,499.
 Geographic Co-Ordinates: 26°42'44.6"N 93°04'22.1"E..
 Total Area Covered: 663 square kilometres.
 Area Includes: Sootea thana [excluding Baghmara (Part), Murhadal, Chilabandha, Barbhagia and Nagsankar mouzas] in Tezpur sub-division, of Biswanath district of Assam.
 Inter State Border : Biswanath.
 Number Of Polling Stations: Year 2011-189,Year 2016-189,Year 2021-76.

Members of Legislative Assembly

Following is the list of past members representing Biswanath Assembly constituency in Assam Legislature.

 1957: Kamakhya Prasad Tripathi, Indian National Congress.
 1962: Kamakhya Prasad Tripathi, Indian National Congress.
 1967: Kamakhya Prasad Tripathi, Indian National Congress.
 1972: Kosheswar Bora, Independent.
 1978: Kosheswar Bora, Janata Party.
 1985: Padmanath Koiri, Independent.
 1991: Nurjamal Sarkar, Indian National Congress.
 1996: Prabin Hazarika, Asom Gana Parishad.
 2001: Nurjamal Sarkar, Indian National Congress.
 2006: Nurjamal Sarkar, Indian National Congress.
 2011: Prabin Hazarika, Asom Gana Parishad.
 2016: Promod Borthakur, Bharatiya Janata Party.

Election results

2016 result

2011 result

See also
 Bishwanath Chariali
 Biswanath
 List of constituencies of Assam Legislative Assembly

References

External links 
 

Assembly constituencies of Assam